The Petru Rareș National College (Colegiul Național Petru Rareș) is the oldest high school in Piatra Neamț, Romania.

The school building dates to 1890–1892, and is classified as a historic monument by Romania's Ministry of Culture and Religious Affairs.

Alumni
Dumitru Coroamă
Ilie Crețulescu
Nicolae Dăscălescu
Constantin Lăcătușu
Gheorghe Manoliu
Verdeanu Mircea-Matei

References

External links
 

Piatra Neamț
Schools in Neamț County
National Colleges in Romania
School buildings completed in 1892
Historic monuments in Neamț County